Zidishu, translated as Bannerman Song or Scion Book, was a popular Chinese folk ballad song during the Qing dynasty (1644–1912), mostly composed and performed by Manchu people. It flourished between 1736 and 1850 and began to decline at the end of the 19th century. In the 18th century, it was considered one of the most elegant popular northern, Beijing-based Chinese songs.

References

Further reading

Chinese storytelling
Manchu culture
Chinese folk music